José Isabel Meza Elizondo (born 29 April 1957) is a Mexican politician from the New Alliance Party. From 2011 to 2012 he served as Deputy of the LXI Legislature of the Mexican Congress representing Nuevo León.

References

1957 births
Living people
Politicians from Nuevo León
New Alliance Party (Mexico) politicians
21st-century Mexican politicians
Deputies of the LXI Legislature of Mexico
Members of the Chamber of Deputies (Mexico) for Nuevo León